From the Cradle to the Brave is the first album by the Norwegian power metal band Highland Glory.

Track listing
 One Last Chance - 04:50 
 Beyond The Pharaoh's Curse - 05:15 
 A Warriors Path - 05:35 
 This Promise I Swear - 04:55 
 Land Of Forgotten Dreams (part 1) - 06:45  
 Land Of Forgotten Dreams (part 2) - 05:52 
 Wear Your Gun To Neverland - 08:19 
 Will We Be Again - 04:29 
 From The Cradle To The Brave - 07:46

Personnel

Musicians
Jan T. Grefstad - vocals
Jack R. Olsen - guitar
Lars Andre Larsen - guitar and keyboard
Knut E. Tøftum - bass
Morten Færøvig - drums

Production
Engineered and mixed by Børge Finstad.
Marius Olaussen and Lars Andre Larsen - assistant engineers.
Produced by Highland Glory and Marius Olaussen.
Mastered by Morten Andersen.
Mark Wilkinson - artwork. 
Jack Roger Olsen - cover concept.
Håkon Grav - band photos

References

2003 albums
Highland Glory albums
Massacre Records albums